Silver Houses Historic District is a national historic district near Darlington, Harford County, Maryland, United States. It is a group of mid-19th century farmsteads and a church in rural east central Harford County. The district comprises a total of 36 resources, including four stone residences with related agricultural outbuildings, and the site of a fifth stone house, marked by a large frame barn, a frame tenant house, and two outbuildings. The houses were built between 1853 and 1859 by members of the Silver family. The district also includes the Deer Creek Harmony Presbyterian Church, a Gothic-influenced stone building of 1871, designed by John W. Hogg.

It was added to the National Register of Historic Places in 1984.

Contributing properties

 Deer Creek Harmony Presbyterian Church, 440 Darlington Road
 Benjamin Silver House and John A. Silver House Site, 3646 Harmony Church Road
 Jeremiah P. Silver House, "Lebanon," aka "Seven Springs Farm," 337 Fox Road
 Silas B. Silver House, "Silverton", 3643 Harmony Church Road
 William F. Silver House, "Shadowstone Farm", 521 Darlington Road

References

External links
, including photo dated 1982, at Maryland Historical Trust
Boundary Map of the Silver Houses Historic District, Harford County, at Maryland Historical Trust

Historic districts in Harford County, Maryland
Italianate architecture in Maryland
Neoclassical architecture in Maryland
Gothic Revival architecture in Maryland
Historic districts on the National Register of Historic Places in Maryland
National Register of Historic Places in Harford County, Maryland